The Bregenzer Frühling (Bregenzer Spring) is a dance festival in Bregenz, Vorarlberg (Austria). It has been held every year between March and June in the Festival Hall of Bregenz (Festspielhaus) since 1987. 

Dance ensembles from all over the world perform their new productions, along with Austrian premieres. Each year, five different dance ensembles perform at the Bregenzer Frühling. With a budget of around EUR 500,000 and up to 10,000 visitors, Bregenzer Spring is one of the most important dance festivals in Austria.

The 2020 edition of the Bregenz Frühling had to be cancelled due to the COVID-19 pandemic.

References

External links 

 Official website of the festival
 Archive of past programmes

Bregenz
Vorarlberg
Festivals in Vorarlberg
Cultural festivals in Austria
Arts festivals in Austria